Mariveles is a municipality in Bataan, the Philippines.

Mariveles may also refer to:
 Mount Mariveles, a mountain in Bataan, Philippines
 Mariveles Naval Section Base, a US Navy base in Bataan
 Mariveles Reef, a reef in the Spratly Islands, currently occupied and administered by Malaysia
 USS Mariveles (1886), a US Navy gunboat
 Mariveles, a barangay in Dauis, Bohol, Philippines